Anssi Juutilainen (born 1 October 1956) is a Finnish ski-orienteering competitor and world champion.

He received an individual gold medal in the classic course at the 1984 World Ski Orienteering Championships in Lavarone, and a gold medal both in the short course and the long course in Skellefteå in 1990.

He finished first overall in the World Cup in Ski Orienteering in 1991, and third in 1989.

See also
 Finnish orienteers
 List of orienteers
 List of orienteering events

References

1956 births
Living people
Finnish orienteers
Male orienteers
Ski-orienteers